Dial Mountain is a mountain located in Essex County, New York. 
The mountain is part of the Colvin Range.
Dial Mountain is flanked to the southwest by Nippletop.

Dial Mountain stands within the watershed of Lake Champlain, which drains into Canada's Richelieu River, the Saint Lawrence River, and into the Gulf of Saint Lawrence.
The west side of Dial Mountain drains into Gill Brook, thence into the East Branch of Ausable River, and into Lake Champlain.
The southeast side of Dial Mountain drains into the headwaters of the North Fork of the Boquet River, thence into Lake Champlain.
The northeast side of Dial Mountain drains into Gravestone Brook, thence into the North Fork of the Boquet River.

See also 
 List of mountains in New York
 Northeast 111 4,000-footers 
 Adirondack High Peaks
 Adirondack Forty-Sixers

Notes

External links 
 

Mountains of Essex County, New York
Adirondack High Peaks
Mountains of New York (state)